Ephestia cypriusella is a species of snout moth in the genus Ephestia. It was described by Roesler in 1965, and is known from Cyprus, Greece and Turkey.

References

Moths described in 1965
Phycitini
Moths of Europe
Moths of Asia